Poligon is an underground station on the Fahrettin Altay—Evka 3 Line of the İzmir Metro in Konak. Located under İnönü Avenue, it consists of two side platforms servicing two tracks. Connection to ESHOT bus service is available at street level.

Poligon was opened on 26 July 2014, along with Fahrettin Altay, and marked the completion of the much delayed westward extension from Üçyol to Fahrettin Altay, which had been under construction since 2005.

Connections
ESHOT operates city bus service on İnönü Avenue.

References

İzmir Metro
Railway stations opened in 2014
2014 establishments in Turkey
Railway stations in İzmir Province